David Hillel Gutmann is an American neurologist. He teaches at Washington University in St. Louis, where he is the Donald O. Schnuck Family Professor, Vice Chair for Research Affairs for the Department of Neurology, and director of the Neurofibromatosis Center at  He is an international expert in Neurofibromatosis, pioneering the use of preclinical models to understand brain tumors and neurodevelopmental delays in children with NF1.

Early life and education 
Raised in Michigan, Gutmann spent summers during his high school volunteering at the Henry Ford Hospital in Detroit, sparking his passion for medicine. While receiving an undergraduate degree at the University of Michigan, Gutmann was introduced to the budding field of genetics, the influence of which sowed seeds for his later research work. As an undergraduate, he also worked as a college disc jockey and attended numerous jazz concerts in Ann Arbor, establishing a life-long love of jazz music.

Further pursuing his education, Gutmann went on to complete his MD and PhD degrees at the University of Michigan. Under the guidance of John E. Niederhuber, he received his PhD in immunogenetics, graduating with distinction in 1986. Gutmann then completed his Neurology residency training at the University of Pennsylvania, spending time in the laboratory of Kenneth Fischbeck, where he was mentored in neurogenetics.

Returning to the University of Michigan for his postdoctoral research fellowship in Human Genetics, Gutmann joined the laboratory of Francis S. Collins. Collins and his team had just cloned the NF1 gene, and Gutmann was tasked with establishing the function of the NF1 gene. During his tenure with Collins, Gutmann identified the NF1 protein, neurofibromin, and proceeded to investigate its function as a RAS regulator.

Research and career 
Gutmann was recruited to Washington University in St. Louis in 1993. He became a full Professor in 2001, and then the Donald O. Schnuck Family Professor in 2002. In 2004, Gutmann founded the Washington University Neurofibromatosis (NF) Center. Gutmann is now the Vice Chair for Research Affairs in the Neurology Department at the Washington University School of Medicine, and co-director of the Washington University NF Clinical Program. In addition to numerous grant review panels and journal editorial boards, he served as a member of the National Institute of Neurological Disorders and Stroke Advisory Council. Gutmann is an elected fellow of the American Academy of Neurology, American Neurological Association and American Association for the Advancement of Science. For his contributions to NF and neuro-oncology, he has been honored with numerous awards, including the 2002 National Neurofibromatosis Foundation Center of Excellence Award, the 2012 Children's Tumor Foundation Frederich von Recklinghausen Award, the 2019 Society for Neuro-Oncology Abhijit Award, and the 2020 American Academy of Neurology Neuro-Oncology Investigator Award. In addition, Gutmann currently serves on the Board of Directors for Jazz St. Louis.

Over the past 25-plus years at Washington University in St. Louis, the Gutmann laboratory has published over 470 peer-reviewed manuscripts. Currently, his research team uses human biospecimens and novel genetically engineered mouse strains to investigate the genetic, molecular, and cellular basis of neurofibromatosis. They are employing these preclinical mouse models to better understand the cellular origins of tumors, the contribution of the tumor microenvironment to tumor formation and growth, and the major growth control pathways that dictate brain development in NF1. The ultimate goal of Gutmann's research is to be able to predict which course NF1 will take in any given individual, and to engineer treatment plans based on those predictions.

As Director of the Washington University NF Center, Gutmann focuses on providing care to those affected with neurofibromatosis. Beyond the hospital, care is also provided through several complementary care programs: Beat NF provides jazz-music motor therapy for affected toddlers, Club NF provides play-based therapy for school-aged children, and Teen NF serves as a peer support and social skills group for affected adolescents. Beat NF is a collaboration between the Washington University NF Center, St. Louis Children's Hospital, and Jazz St. Louis, the only jazz music-based motor therapy program for children with NF1.

Awards and honors 
 1993 March of Dimes Young Investigator Award, FASEB Summer
 1994 Peter A. Aron National Neurofibromatosis Foundation Award
 1996 Decade of the Brain Plenary Session Speaker, American Academy of Neurology
 1998 Carolyn Farb Endowed Lecture in Neurofibromatosis
 1998 National Neurofibromatosis Foundation Crystal Award
 1999 Walker Lecturer in Neurofibromatosis
 1999 Eliason Teaching Award, Department of Neurology
 2001 Linse Block Neuro-oncology Visiting Professor, Mayo Clinic Foundation
 2002 National Neurofibromatosis Foundation Center of Excellence Award
 2003 Washington University School of Medicine Clinical Teacher of the Year Award
 2006 Manuel R. Gomez Named Visiting Professor
 2007 Ninth Annual Arthur and Sonia Labatt Brain Tumor Research Centre Lecturer
 2007 Award for Excellence in Pediatric Basic/Translational Research, Society for Neuro-Oncology
 2008 Award for Excellence in Pediatric Translational Research, Society for Neuro-Oncology
 2008 Takao Hoshino Lectureship, University of California – San Francisco
 2010 Pfizer Visiting Professor, University of Virginia
 2010 Washington University/Siteman Cancer Center "Rock Doc"
 2012 Children's Tumor Foundation Frederich Von Recklinghausen (Lifetime Achievement) Award
 2013 Susan B. Stine Memorial Lectureship
 2013 16th Annual Sara Hertafeld Memorial Lectureship
 2014 8th Annual Riley Church Guest Professor, Stanford University
 2017 Alexander von Humboldt Research Award
 2017-2022 Berlin Institute of Health Einstein Visiting Fellowship
 2018 Elected Fellow, American Academy of Neurology (AAN)
 2019 Society for Neuro-Oncology Abjihit Guha Award and Lecture
 2020 American Academy of Neurology Neuro-Oncology Investigator Award
 2020 National Neurofibromatosis Network Advocate of Hope Award
2020 American Neurological Association George W. Jacobi Award
2020 Elected Fellow, American Association for the Advancement of Science (AAAS)

References 

Scientists from Cincinnati
American neurologists
Living people
Scientists from Michigan
Year of birth missing (living people)
Washington University in St. Louis faculty
University of Michigan alumni
Washington University School of Medicine faculty